Alcantarea glaziouana is a plant species in the genus Alcantarea. This species is endemic to Brazil.

Cultivars
 Alcantarea 'John Stodart'

References

BSI Cultivar Registry Retrieved 11 October 2009

glaziouana
Flora of Brazil